"Get Fresh" is the third single from Kid Sister's debut studio album Ultraviolet. It contains samples from the 2007 song "Lower State Of Consciousness" by ZZT.

Track listing

References

Kid Sister songs
2009 songs